Consort Cheng may refer to:

Empress Dowager Cheng (died 335), concubine of Later Zhao's founding emperor Shi Le
Concubine Cheng (Qianlong) (died 1784), concubine of the Qianlong Emperor
Noble Consort Cheng (1813–1888), concubine of the Daoguang Emperor

See also
Consort Zheng (disambiguation)
Consort Chen (disambiguation)